The Gletscherchamm is a mountain of the Swiss Silvretta Alps, located between the Prättigau and the Engadin in the canton of Graubünden. It lies just west of the Silvretta Pass.

References

External links
 Gletscherchamm on Hikr

Mountains of the Alps
Alpine three-thousanders
Mountains of Graubünden
Mountains of Switzerland